Christophe Aubanel (born 3 November 1976 in Marseille) is a former French professional football player who last played for Gazélec Ajaccio.

He played on the professional level in Ligue 2 for FC Gueugnon, FC Lorient, US Créteil-Lusitanos and FC Istres. He signed for Lorient in 2004.

He played one game in the 2000–01 UEFA Cup for FC Gueugnon.

After retirement he was imprisoned for drug trafficking.

References 

1976 births
Living people
French footballers
Ligue 2 players
US Boulogne players
FC Gueugnon players
FC Lorient players
US Créteil-Lusitanos players
FC Istres players
SO Cassis Carnoux players
US Marseille Endoume players

Association football forwards